is a 1,925m volcano, located in Nagano Prefecture, Japan.

Outline
The tallest peak of Mount Kirigamine is Mount Kuruma, on which there is a weather radar site. 
Most of the mountain is covered in grass with sparse bushes and rocks. The south and east sides are suitable for gliding with a narrow landing zone in the vicinity of a parking lot and a huge emergency landing at the west side of the mountain. The southeast cliffs are a launching point for gliders, with winds above 3 meters. The north part is equipped with ski lifts.

Access
Vehicle access to the bottom of Kirigamine does not require four-wheel drive but snow chains may be necessary if there is heavy snow.

Gallery

See also
List of volcanoes in Japan
List of mountains in Japan

References

External links 

 
 Kirigamine - Geological Survey of Japan

Kirigamine
Kirigamine
Pleistocene shield volcanoes
Volcanoes of Honshū